Macaria pinistrobata, the white pine angle, is a moth of the family Geometridae. It is found in Nova Scotia, Maine, Quebec, Ontario, Michigan, Wisconsin, New Jersey, Maryland, North Carolina, Kentucky, Tennessee and Georgia.

There are one to two generations per year.

The larvae feed on Pinus strobus.

External links
Image
Moths of Maryland
Description of the Larval Stage

Macariini
Moths described in 1972